The Iraq Area Command or Iraq Regional Command of the Ottoman Empire was one of the military formation of the Ottoman Army. It was formed in Iraq in the initial stage of World War I.

Formations

Order of Battle, November 1914 
In November 1914, the corps was structured as follows:

Iraq Area Command (Commander: Cavit Pasha)
38th Division

Order of Battle, January 1915 
In January 1918, the corps was structured as follows:

Iraq Area Command (Commander: Kaymakam Süleyman Askerî Bey)
38th Division
Sahrıca Detachment (Provisional Dicle Division since January 25, 1915)
Kerha Group
Fırat Group

Because Süleyman Askerî Bey committed suicide on April 14, 1915, Nureddin Bey was appointed the commander on April 20. Nureddin Bey arrived in June to take command of the Iraq Area Command and he was appointed the Governor of Basra Province and Baghdad Province at the same time. On December 21, 1915, German Generalfeldmarschall Colmar von der Goltz arrived at Baghdad and changed the name of the Command as the Iraq Army (Irak Ordusu).

Order of Battle, Late 1915 
In late 1915, the corps was structured as follows:

Iraq Area Command (Commander: Miralay Nureddin Bey)
XIII Corps
35th Division, 38th Division
XVIII Corps (Commander: Miralay Halil Bey)
45th Division, 51st Division

Sources

Field armies of the Ottoman Empire
Corps of the Ottoman Empire
Military units and formations of the Ottoman Empire in World War I
Baghdad vilayet
Commands (military formations)
1914 establishments in the Ottoman Empire
1914 in Ottoman Iraq
1915 in Ottoman Iraq
1916 in Ottoman Iraq